Ramsbottomia is a genus of fungi in the family Pyronemataceae.

The genus name of Ramsbottomia is in honour of John Ramsbottom  (1885–1974), who was a British mycologist.

The genus was circumscribed by W.D. Buckley in Trans. Brit. Mycol. Soc. vol.9 on page 44 in 1923.

Species
As accepted by Species Fungorum;
 Ramsbottomia asperior 
 Ramsbottomia lamprosporoidea 

Former species;
 R. crechqueraultii  now Lamprospora crechqueraultii (still in Pyronemataceae)
 R. macrantha  now Lamprospora crechqueraultii

References

External links

Pyronemataceae
Pezizales genera